Receivable Turnover Ratio or Debtor's Turnover Ratio is an accounting measure used to measure how effective a company is in extending credit as well as collecting debts. The receivables turnover ratio is an activity ratio, measuring how efficiently a firm uses its assets.

Formula:

A high ratio implies either that a company operates on a cash basis or that its extension of credit and collection of accounts receivable is efficient.  While a low ratio implies the company is not making the timely collection of credit. 

A good accounts receivable turnover depends on how quickly a business recovers its dues or, in simple terms how high or low the turnover ratio is. For instance, with a 30-day payment policy, if the customers take 46 days to pay back, the Accounts Receivable Turnover is low.

Relation ratios

 Days' sales in receivables = 365 / Receivable Turnover Ratio
 Average Collection Period = 
 Average Debtor collection period =  × 365 = Average collection period in days,
 Average Creditor payment period =  × 365 = Average Payment period in days,

See also
Debtor collection period
Cash flow
Working capital

References

Financial ratios
Working capital management
Accounts receivable